John Richardson Auldjo (26 July 1805 – 6 May 1886), FRS, FRGS, was a Canadian-British traveller, geologist, writer and artist. He was British Consul at Geneva. He was a close friend of Edward Bulwer-Lytton and a member of Sir William Gell's inner circle at Naples.

Life
In 1805, John Auldjo was born into a prominent family of merchants and politicians at Montreal. He was the elder of the two sons of Alexander Auldjo and his wife Eweretta Jane Richardson (1774–1808), sister of John Richardson. His mother's first cousins included John Forsyth and Edward Ellice. His brother, Thomas Richardson Auldjo (1808–1837), married Anna, one of the daughters of William McGillivray and a niece of both John MacDonald of Garth and General Sir Archibald Campbell. John Auldjo was a godson of Simon McGillivray, who looked after him in London after he was orphaned at the age of sixteen.

In 1822, Auldjo entered Trinity College, Cambridge. Before he embarked on his Grand Tour, he secured a place at Lincoln's Inn, London. In 1827, during the early stages of his tour, he decided to climb to the top of Mont Blanc, going with six guides. At the summit he shared a bottle of wine with the guides and then sat down to write a short letter to his sister. The letter, still preserved today and signed on the back by all six guides, is one of the most evocative items in the Archives of the Alpine Club. Auldjo's 1828 written account of the ascent, with his own illustrations, was a success and ran to three editions.

In 1830, he made the decision to remain in Europe by giving power of attorney over his Canadian properties to his lawyer, Thomas Kirkpatrick. From then, Auldjo lived in Naples as one of the inner circle of Sir William Gell. This inner circle included Sir William Drummond, Keppel Richard Craven, Lady Blessington, Sir Walter Scott and Edward Bulwer-Lytton, who was Auldjo's particularly close friend. Lord Byron, another frequent guest at Naples, was also well known to him.

In 1831, Auldjo visited Mount Vesuvius during a time of vigorous activity. He published a book on his return filled with hand-coloured lithographs of the volcano in full eruption. His investigations of Vesuvius were subsequently rewarded with Fellowships at the Royal Society and the Royal Geographical Society.

He was Walter Scott's cicerone between January and April 1832. In 1833, he toured Constantinople and the Greek Islands, publishing an account of his time there in 1835. Since 1826, when he was put forward by Simon McGillivray at London, Auldjo had been an active Freemason. In 1837, McGillivray appointed him his Deputy as Grand Master of Upper Canada, and as such in the late summer of that year he travelled there. Meanwhile, his brother who had been staying with him at Naples, died. He returned to London, and was last noted in the Freemason records as attending a meeting there in 1841–2. He then fades into obscurity and reappears in Geneva in 1870, communicating with his lawyer, Sir George Airey Kirkpatrick, regarding the Canadian property that he had made over to his deceased niece, Madeliene Auldjo (d.1858). He held the unpaid position of British Consul at Geneva from 1872 until his death in 1886. He was buried there at the Chatelaine Cemetery.

Works

Narrative of an Ascent to the Summit of Mont Blanc: On 8 and 9 August 1827 (London, 1828)
Sketches of Vesuvius, with short accounts of its principal eruptions, from the commencement of the Christian era to the present time (Naples, 1832)
Journal of a visit to Constantinople, and some of the Greek islands in the Spring and Summer of 1833 (London, 1835)

References

Further reading
Auldjo: A Life of John Auldjo (1805–1886): 'a clever man and a good fellow' (Michael Russell, 2009), by Peter Jamieson
The Auldjo Papers at Queen's University, Kingston, Ontario

External links 
 
 
 Pictures and texts of Narrative of an ascent to the summit of Mont Blanc : on the 8th and 9th august, 1827 by John Auldjo can be found in the database VIATIMAGES.

1805 births
1886 deaths
People from Montreal
Anglophone Quebec people
Alumni of Trinity College, Cambridge
British mountain climbers
Canadian people of Scottish descent
English illustrators
Fellows of the Royal Society
Fellows of the Royal Geographical Society
Canadian Freemasons
British expatriates in Italy
British expatriates in Switzerland
Pre-Confederation Canadian emigrants to the United Kingdom
Members of Lincoln's Inn